İnce Memed is a series of four epic novels written by the Turkish novelist Yaşar Kemal. The novels follow the life of Memed, the only son of a poor widow who escapes from his village in the Anatolian landowners and transforms himself into a legendary, Robin Hood-like figure, championing the landless peasants of Anatolia in their struggle against their corrupt and greedy landowners. 

İnce Memed (1955), the first novel in the tetralogy, was Kemal's first published novel. Subsequent volumes of the İnce Memed saga were published in 1969, 1984 and 1987.

The tetralogy
 İnce Memed (1955); English translation: Memed, My Hawk (1961)
 İnce Memed II (1969);  They Burn the Thistles (1972)
 İnce Memed III (1984)
 İnce Memed IV (1987)

Novels by Yaşar Kemal
Novel series
Novels set in Turkey